Skien is a city and municipality in Vestfold og Telemark county in Norway. In modern times it is regarded as part of the traditional region of Grenland, although historically it belonged to Grenmar/Skiensfjorden, while Grenland referred the Norsjø area and Bø. The administrative centre of the municipality is the city of Skien. Skien is also the capital of Vestfold og Telemark county.

Skien is one of Norway's oldest cities, with an urban history dating back to the Middle Ages, and received privileges as a market town in 1358. From the 15th century, the city was governed by a 12-member council. The modern municipality of Skien was established on 1 January 1838 (see formannskapsdistrikt). The rural municipalities of Gjerpen and Solum were merged into the municipality of Skien on 1 January 1964.

The conurbation of Porsgrunn/Skien is reckoned by Statistics Norway to be the seventh largest urban area in Norway, straddling an area of three municipalities: Skien municipality (about 62% of the population), Porsgrunn (30%), and Bamble (8%). This area is home to more than 100,000 people.

Skien was historically a centre of seafaring, timber exports and early industrialization, and was one of Norway's two or three largest cities between the 16th and 19th centuries. It was also one of Norway's most internationally oriented cities, with extensive contact with its export markets in the Low Countries, the United Kingdom and Denmark. It retained its position as Eastern Norway's leading commercial city until the 19th century, when it gradually started to lose importance to the emerging capital of Christiania following the Napoleonic Wars. The city was the birthplace of playwright Henrik Ibsen, and many of his famous dramas are set in places reminiscent of early 19th-century Skien.

General information

Name
The Old Norse form of the name was Skiða (from the word skiða which means "straight plank", and which is also the origin of the word ski), and the town is probably named after a brook (with a straight run) with this name.

Coat-of-arms
The coat-of-arms is derived from the oldest known seal of the city, dating back to 1609. The seal shows two skis and in the middle a cross, with a small star on the crosspoint. The skis are a semi-canting element (based on a misunderstanding of the meaning of the town's name) and the cross is a religious symbol. There have been several theories about the meaning of the cross, but its meaning is not clearly known. It has been suggested that it is a symbol for the main church in Skien, the Holy Cross church. The small star may be a symbol of St. Mary as the second medieval church of Skien was devoted to her. Besides the skis and cross, there are two meadow buttercups on each side.

In 1854, the arms were shown as two skis, but the cross was now made from ski poles, as another canting element. This remained so until the early half of the 20th century.

In the 1980s, the city officially adopted the current arms, which are identical to the oldest seal. The colours are the colours that have been used since the 19th century. The differences between the seal and the present arms are that in the arms the cross is placed on top of the skis and the star is changed from a four-pointed star to a six-pointed star, and that the cross is made of ski-poles.

(See also Alvdal and Trysil)

History

Until 1979, it was thought that Skien was founded in the 14th century. However, the archaeological discovery of a carving of the Skien animal has established that its founding preceded 1000 A.D. The city was then a meeting place for inland farmers and marine traders, and also a centre for trading whetstones from Eidsborg (inland Telemark). Gimsøy Abbey was founded in the 12th century. Skien was given formal commercial town rights by the Norwegian crown in 1358. Timber has historically been the principal export from Skien, and in the sixteenth century the city became the Kingdom's leading port for shipping timber. The oldest remaining building is Gjerpen church (built in approximately 1150).

From the 16th century, the city came to be dominated by a group of families known as patricians. In an 1882 letter to Georg Brandes, Henrik Ibsen mentions the families Paus, Plesner, von der Lippe, Cappelen and Blom as the most prominent patrician families when he grew up there.
The current town layout was fixed after the last town fire in 1886. In 1964, the rural municipalities Solum and Gjerpen were merged with Skien town, forming the Skien municipality.

Frogner Manor in Skien
Frogner Manor (Frogner Hovedgård) is a manor house on the outskirts of Skien. The manor house was built for shipowner and timber merchant Christopher Hansen Blom (died 1879) and his wife Marie Elisabeth (Cappelen) Blom (died 1834). The main building is influenced by Italian Renaissance architecture. The garden was laid out in English landscape style in the 1850s.

Kapitelberget
The Church on Kapitelberget (Kirken på Kapitelberget) was a medieval church. Kapitelberget was a private chapel on Bratsberg farm dating to the early 1100s. It is not known when the church went out of use, but Bratsberg farm burned down in 1156. in 1576, Peder Claussøn Friis reviewed it as a ruin. The site was first excavated in 1901. In 1928, Gerhard Fischer undertook restoration and preservation. The work was completed in 1933.

Transportation

Roads
The main road into Skien is from the E18 road and through Porsgrunn, on either road 36 or 354 that runs up along Skienselva on each side. Another common route used by most buses coming from Oslo is road 32, that goes through Siljan, Steinsholt, Lågendalen, Hvittingfoss and Hof. Road 32 enters the E18 in Hof.
564598-168

Water
Skien is the main terminus for the Telemark Canal. The "Norsjø-Skienskanalen" section of the canal, with one terminus at Skien and the other at Løveid, was built in 1854–1861. In Europe, canals were commonly built in the pre-railroad period to transport goods, timber, and passengers. The "Porsgrunn river" runs from the lock at Skien through Porsgrunn to the Frierfjord. Skien harbour is located at Vold havneterminal.

Railroads
Skien was connected to the Norwegian railway network (Vestfoldbanen) in 1882. In 1919, Bratsbergbanen opened between Skien and Notodden. Vy still operates regular train services on both railways.

Air
The local airport is Skien Airport, Geiteryggen. It serves domestic flights to Bergen and Stavanger as well as flights to Trondheim by the airline Vildanden. For the present, no commercial flights are operated from Geiteryggen.

Culture and recreation

Ibsen and Telemark Museums
Skien was the birthplace of the author and playwright Henrik Ibsen, probably the most important writer to emerge from Norway. Many of Ibsen's plays are set in an unnamed provincial town that suggests Skien. The former Ibsen family homestead at Venstøp outside Skien was established as the Ibsen Museum in 1958. The Ibsen Museum has now been incorporated into the multi-site Telemark Museum, which includes several other historical sites.

Music and entertainment
Ibsenhuset is the local culture and conference center in Skien. It also houses concerts by international and national artists, opera, theatre and other cultural events. Skien kunstforening has a department in Ibsenhuset, and the local culture school and library are also located in the building. The venue is also home to the regional symphony orchestra, Grenland Symfoniorkester.

Teater Ibsen is the city theatre, and is still used for small productions.

Skien Church is the largest church in Telemark county, and is famous for its two twin towers and great organ.

In the summer of 2009 Elton John held a concert at the new Skagerak Arena, the soccer pitch for the local soccer team Odd Grenland. Next to Skagerak Arena is Stevneplassen, where car shows, concerts, flea markets and the annual "Handelsstevnet" – a trade fair with entertainment and a small amusement park – are held. The Handelsstevnet was closed down after the annual fair in 2011.

In Skotfoss, a small suburb of Skien further up the Telemark Canal, concerts are held at Løveid Sluser. There are plans to hold cultural events and concerts at Klosterøya (a downtown graffiti park).

Amusement parks
There are no local amusement parks in Skien. Lekeland was a small amusement park for children just outside the town, but it closed in 2008. Every year there is a traveling carnival with rides and merry-go-arounds for a week, in "Stevneplassen". There is an indoor waterpark and a big outdoor climbing park in Skien Fritidspark.

Media
The daily newspapers Varden and Telemarksavisa are published in Skien. The local television for Telemark, TVTelemark, is located in Skien.

Economy

Commerce and industry
The largest industries are ABB Asea Brown Boveri (engineering firm), Norske Skog Union (a paper mill which was closed down in the spring of 2006), and EFD Induction (induction heating and induction welding).

Other important places of work are Telemark Hospital and Vestfold og Telemark county municipality.
Agder Court of Appeal is located in Skien.

Because the E18 highway lies outside of the metropolitan area of Grenland, Skien has lost many important companies to the cities in Vestfold.

Shopping
Skien has three shopping malls:
Handelsbyen Herkules (110 stores and services)
Arkaden Skien Storsenter (47 stores and services)
Lietorvet Senter (28 stores and services)

Sports

Arenas
Gjerpenhallen
Mælahallen
Skagerak Arena
Skienshallen
Skien Ishall
Skien Isstadion

Clubs
Gjerpen IF (handball)
Odds Ballklubb (football)
Sceen Curling Klubb (curling)
Skien Ishockeyklubb (ice hockey)
Tollnes Ballklubb (football)
Moflata table tennis (table tennis)
Skien Innebandyklubb (Floorball)

Notable people

Public service & public thinking 
 Jørgen von Ansbach (ca.1510–ca.1590) German-Norwegian timber merchant, Mayor of Skie
 Diderik von Cappelen (1761–1828) a wholesaler, shipowner, estate owner and politician
 Ulrich Fredrich von Cappelen (1770–1820) ship owner and timber merchant
 Severin Løvenskiold (1777–1856), landowner, Prime Minister, Governor of Norway
 Peter Andreas Munch (1810–1863), historian, worked on the medieval history of Norway
 Brynild Anundsen (1841–1913), Norwegian-American editor and publisher
 Gunnar Knudsen (1848–1928), Prime Minister of Norway 1908/1910 & 1913/1920
 Hjalmar Johansen (1867–1913), polar explorer
 Halvdan Koht (1873–1965) a Norwegian historian and politician 
 Carl Størmer (1874–1957) a Norwegian mathematician and astrophysicist
 George Awsumb (1880–1959), Norwegian-American architect
 Alfhild Hovdan (1904–1982) tourist manager, started the Trafalgar Square Christmas tree
 Herman Wold (1908–1992) a Swedish econometrician and statistician
 Einfrid Halvorsen (born 1937) a trade unionist and mayor of Skien, 1983 to 1986
 Bjørn Tore Godal (born 1945) politician, Minister of Foreign Affairs 1994/1997 
 Jon Fredrik Baksaas (born 1954), CEO of Telenor
 Margareth Øvrum (born 1958) an engineer and executive VP of Statoil
 Eskil Pedersen (born 1984) leader of the Labour Party´s Youth Organization, AUF, during terrorist attract on AUF at  Utøya on 22 July 2011
 Bastian Vasquez (1990 – ca.mid 2015) a Norwegian ISIS jihadist

The Arts 
 August Cappelen (1827–1852) a Norwegian painter of melancholic, dramatic landscapes
 Henrik Ibsen (1828–1906), a Norwegian playwright and theatre director.
 Iver Holter (1850–1941) a Norwegian composer and conductor
 Rolf Christensen (1894–1962) actor in operettas, plays and farces and film director 
 Aage Samuelsen (1915–1987) a Norwegian evangelist, singer and composer
 Knut Wigert (1916–2006) a Norwegian actor, known for his Ibsen roles 
 Kari Lövaas (born 1939) a Norwegian operatic soprano
 Tor Åge Bringsværd (born 1939) an author, playwright, editor and translator
 Yngvar Numme (born 1944) singer, actor, revue writer and director 
 Torhild Staahlen (1947-2022) a Norwegian operatic mezzo-soprano
 Iver Kleive (born 1949) a Norwegian composer and organist
 Audun Kleive (born 1961) a Norwegian jazz drummer
 Bugge Wesseltoft (born 1964) a jazz musician, pianist, composer and producer
 Gisle Kverndokk (born 1967) a Norwegian contemporary composer
 Heidi Hauge (born 1967) a Norwegian folk and country music singer
 Paal Flaata (born 1968) a Norwegian vocalist
 Bård Tufte Johansen (born 1969) a Norwegian comedian
 Wetle Holte (born 1973) a Norwegian jazz drummer and composer
 Lage Lund (born 1978) a Norwegian jazz guitarist
 Atle Pettersen (born 1989) a Norwegian singer and songwriter
 Julie Bergan (born 1994) a Norwegian singer and songwriter

Sport 

 Per Mathias Jespersen (1888–1964) gymnast, team silver medallist at 1908 Summer Olympics
 Werner Nilsen (1904–1992) an American high-scoring soccer forward
 Nicolai Johansen (1917–1999) Secretary Gen. the Norwegian Football Association, 1955/1983
 Geir Karlsen (born 1948) retired footballer with nearly 300 club caps and 32 for Norway
 Dag Erik Pedersen (born 1959) a retired road racing cyclist, now anchorman with NRK
 Jeanette Nilsen (born 1972) handball player, team bronze medallist at the 2000 Summer Olympics
 Tommy Svindal Larsen (born 1973) retired footballer with 517 club caps and 24 for Norway
 Torjus Hansén (born 1973) a Norwegian former footballer with 373 club caps
 Frode Johnsen (born 1974) retired footballer with 518 club caps and 35 for Norway
 Alexander Aas (born 1978) a retired Norwegian footballer with 350 club caps
 Erik Midtgarden (born 1987) a Norwegian footballer with 320 club caps

Twin towns – sister cities

Skien is twinned with:

 Loimaa, Finland
 Minot, United States
 Mosfellsbær, Iceland
 Onești, Romania
 Sorrento, Italy
 Thisted, Denmark
 Uddevalla, Sweden

References

External links

Municipal fact sheet from Statistics Norway

 
Municipal website 
Municipal website 
Municipal website 

 
Municipalities of Vestfold og Telemark
Cities and towns in Norway